Drop It Low may refer to:
 "Drop It Low" (Ester Dean song), 2009
 "Drop It Low" (Kat DeLuna song), 2011
 "Drop It Low" (S.O.S song), 2013